Josef Angelo Neumann (18 August 1838 – 20 December 1910) was a German operatic baritone and theater director. First a baritone at major opera houses in Europe, including the Vienna Imperial Opera, he was the managing director of the Leipzig Opera and the Estates Theatre in Prague. He is known as an early promoter of the stage works by Richard Wagner, namely the Ring cycle, which he presented with the sets and costumes of the world premiere at the Bayreuth Festival, first in Leipzig and then on a European tour.

Life 
Neumann was born in Stampfen. He developed his interest in singing at an early age and received training as an opera singer. After engagements as a baritone in Berlin, Cologne, Krakow, Ödenburg, Bratislava and Gdansk, he came to the Vienna Imperial Opera in 1862, where he remained active until 1876. During these years he made his first acquaintance with Richard Wagner and his work. With his first wife Pauline Aurelie, née von Mihalovits, he had a son, Karl Eugen Neumann, born in 1865.

Opera director in Leipzig (1876–1882) 
In 1876 he became managing director of the Leipzig Opera. His direction began with a production of Lohengrin; further operas by Richard Wagner followed as well as performances of Verdi's Aida and Bizet's Carmen. In April 1878 the first external performance of the entire stage consecration festival Der Ring des Nibelungen took place in Leipzig after its premiere in 1876 at the Bayreuth Festival. In 1881 he organized further performances of the Ring in Berlin.

Director of the travelling Richard Wagner Theatre (1882–1883) 
After acquiring the original stage sets and costumes (by Carl Emil Doepler) of the Bayreuth premiere, Neumann undertook a kind of European tour with complete performances of The Ring of the Nibelung by a travelling ensemble. In May 1882 a guest performance took place in London, with the Julius Laubeschen Kapelle from Hamburg under the direction of the Leipzig Kapellmeister Anton Seidl. Between September 1882 and June 1883 a total of 135 Ring performances and more than 50 Wagner concerts took place, among others in April 1883 (two months after Wagner's death) at the Teatro La Fenice in Venice.

Opera director in Prague (1885–1910) 
In 1885 Neumann became artistic director of the Estates Theatre in Prague, whose new building he organized as Státní opera Praha (State Opera). In his second marriage he married the actress Johanna Török in 1887. In 1894 he encouraged Emil Nikolaus von Reznicek to write the opera Donna Diana.

Neumann died in Prague at the age of 72. A hall in today's Prague State Opera is named after him.

Publications 
Various letters from Neumann to musicians and composers have survived. He wrote an autobiographical book focused on his memories of Wagner, Erinnerungen an Richard Wagner, published in Leipzig in 1907.

References

Cited sources

External links 

 

German operatic baritones
19th-century German male opera singers
German theatre directors
19th-century German male writers
1838 births
1910 deaths
People from Stupava, Malacky District
19th-century German non-fiction writers
German male non-fiction writers